Tlaltetela is a municipality located in the montane central zone in the State of Veracruz, about 25 km from state capital Xalapa. It has a surface of 266.50 km2. The name comes from the Náhuatl language tlal- (land) and tetl (rocks). It was formerly called Axocuapan (from Nahuatl Atl-Xoxoc-Apan, meaning “in the acid water". By the decree 373 of May 8, 1979, Axocuapan was renamed Tlaltetela. In 1998, the first recreational park and the municipal library were opened. On July 12, 2020, a curfew was decreed, due to the increase of COVID-19 cases in the municipality, as the first formal quarantine in Mexico.

Geographic limits

The municipality of Tlaltetela is delimited to the north by Jalcomulco, Coatepec and Teocelo, to the east by Puente Nacional, to the south by Huatusco and to the orient by Puebla State. La Antigua is watered by the river.

Agriculture

The area produces principally limes, maize, beans, coffee, sugar cane and mango.

Celebrations

In Tlaltetela, in March takes place the celebration in honor to San José, Patron of the town, and in December takes place the celebration in honor to Virgen de Guadalupe.

Weather

The weather in Tlaltetela is very cold and wet all year with rains in summer and autumn.

References

External links

  Municipal Official webpage
  Municipal Official Information

Municipalities of Veracruz